Garzê may refer to:

Garzê Tibetan Autonomous Prefecture, in Sichuan, China
Garzê Town, the main town in the prefecture
Garzê County, in Sichuan, China